An interlocutor is someone who informally explains the views of a government and also can relay messages back to a government. Unlike a spokesperson, an interlocutor often has no formal position within a government or any formal authority to speak on its behalf, and even when they do, everything an interlocutor says is his own personal opinion and not the official view of anyone. Communications between interlocutors are often useful at conveying information and ideas. Often interlocutors will talk with each other before formal negotiations. Interlocutors play an extremely important role in Sino-American relations.

Examples 
 Narinder Nath Vohra, Government of India's former Special Representative for carrying out the Jammu and Kashmir Dialogue.
 Dineshwar Sharma, Government of India's former Special Representative for carrying out the Jammu and Kashmir Dialogue.
 R. N. Ravi, Government of India's former Special Representative for carrying out the Nagaland Peace Accord.

References 

Political occupations